Jan Siemerink and Daniel Vacek were the defending champions, but did not play together this year.  Siemerink partnered Martin Damm, losing in the quarterfinals.  Vacek partnered Alexander Mronz, losing in the first round.

David Adams and Andrei Olhovskiy won the title, defeating Jean-Philippe Fleurian and Rodolphe Gilbert 6–1, 6–4 in the final.

Seeds

  David Adams /  Andrei Olhovskiy (champions)
  Jakob Hlasek /  Yevgeny Kafelnikov (quarterfinals)
  Sergio Casal /  Emilio Sánchez (quarterfinals)
  Tom Nijssen /  Menno Oosting (quarterfinals)

Draw

Draw

External links
Main Draw on ATP Archive

Open 13
1995 ATP Tour